Vršnik is a dispersed settlement west of Zgornja Kungota in the western Slovene Hills in the Municipality of Kungota in northeastern Slovenia.

References

External links
Vršnik on Geopedia

Populated places in the Municipality of Kungota